Eugene Andrew Stump (August 9, 1925 –  2014) was an American former professional basketball player. Stump was selected in the 1947 BAA Draft by the Boston Celtics after a collegiate career at DePaul. He played for the Celtics, Minneapolis Lakers and Waterloo Hawks in his three-year BAA/NBA career.

Stump's death was listed in the Fall 2014 edition of DePaul Magazine.

BAA/NBA career statistics

Regular season

Playoffs

References

External links

1925 births
2014 deaths
Date of death missing
Basketball players from Chicago
Boston Celtics draft picks
Boston Celtics players
DePaul Blue Demons men's basketball players
Forwards (basketball)
Guards (basketball)
Minneapolis Lakers players
Waterloo Hawks players
American men's basketball players